Vivarail was a British rolling stock manufacturer, founded in 2012 and based in Southam. Vivarail's main project was the conversion of retired London Underground D78 Stock into two new classes for National Rail services. It was led by former Chiltern Railways chairman Adrian Shooter; Railroad Development Corporation is a shareholder.

In November 2022, the company entered into administration. Some of its assets have been purchased by train operating company GWR.

Demise
The company announced their intention to appoint administrators in November 2022, and entered administration on 1 December 2022. Its  trains were temporarily withdrawn from passenger service on the Marston Vale line by London Northwestern Railway the same day.

The business is currently being wound down and has ceased trading. 
In February 2023, assets including rolling stock and intellectual property rights were purchased by train operator GWR, who have also employed nine Vivarail staff.

Diesel and battery units

In November 2014, Vivarail bought 156 driving motor cars and 70 carriages of ex London Underground D78 Stock which were being replaced by S Stock. The stated purpose of the Class 230 is to ameliorate a perceived shortage of affordable, modern rolling stock on Britain's regional rail routes, resulting from the slow pace of electrification.

Electric units

Other units will retain their electric capability as they have been re-engineered into Class 484 units for use on the Island Line.

References

External links
Official website
Battery Powered Train | Fully Charged, Youtube

Companies based in Stratford-upon-Avon
Locomotive manufacturers of the United Kingdom
Rolling stock manufacturers of the United Kingdom
2012 establishments in England